Konrad Stäheli (17 December 1866 – 5 November 1931) was a Swiss sports shooter who competed in the late 19th century and early 20th century and participated in the 1900 Summer Olympics and the 1906 Intercalated Games.

Biography
He participated in shooting at the 1900 Summer Olympics in Paris and won three gold medals – in the Military Pistol team and the Military Rifle team, and in the Military Rifle individual. He also won a bronze medal in the free pistol competition; fellow Swiss shooter Karl Roderer won gold. Participating in shooting at the 1906 Intercalated Games at Athens, Stäheli took five more medals – a gold medal, two silver medals and a bronze medal in the individual rifle events, and another gold medal in the team rifle competition. His nine total medals in Olympic shooting competition remained a record until the United States' Carl Osburn won 11, all in rifle events, between 1912 and 1924.

Stäheli also won the 1906 World Championship in 50 m Pistol. In 1909, in Hamburg, Germany, Stäheli  became the first ever person to break the 1000 point barrier in the free rifle event.

Achievements
Stäheli won 44 medals in the individual events (69 medals counting the events team) at the World Shooting Championships.

He won 38 gold, 17 silver and 10 bronze at the World Championships and 3 gold and 1 bronze at the Summer Olympics, but in 1900 Summer Olympics the events were valid as World Championship, therefore the total is 41/17/11.

See also
 World Shooting Championship Multiple Medallist

References

External links
 

1866 births
1931 deaths
Swiss male sport shooters
ISSF pistol shooters
ISSF rifle shooters
Olympic gold medalists for Switzerland
Olympic bronze medalists for Switzerland
Olympic shooters of Switzerland
Shooters at the 1900 Summer Olympics
Shooters at the 1906 Intercalated Games
Olympic medalists in shooting
Medalists at the 1900 Summer Olympics
Medalists at the 1906 Intercalated Games
Sportspeople from Thurgau